William Columbus Davis (August 5, 1867 – October 4, 1934) was the 11th Lieutenant Governor of Alabama from 1927 to 1931. A Democrat, Davis served Governor Bibb Graves of the same political party.

A native of Iuka, Mississippi, Davis relocated to Hamilton, Alabama in 1890 in order to practice law after years of teaching public school in Mississippi. Two years after moving his law practice to Jasper, Alabama, Davis was elected to the Alabama House of Representatives in 1891. In addition to his time in the House, Davis served as a solicitor of the 14th Judicial Circuit, a chairman of the Congressional Committee, and a member of the Alabama State Committee.

His son, William Columbus Davis, Jr., 1910–2003, was a distinguished Latin Americanist scholar. He established the Latin American Studies Program and taught at The George Washington University for decades. Later he held the Latin America Chair at the National War College for ten years. The younger Davis wrote The Columns of Athens, The Last Conquistadores, and Warnings from the Far South.

References
Alabama Department of Archives and History, Official and Statistical Register, 1927,  22.
ADAH Alabama Lieutenant Governors William C. Davis. (October 18, 2006) Retrieved on November 12, 2006.

External links
 Biography courtesy of the Alabama Department of Archives

Lieutenant Governors of Alabama
1867 births
1934 deaths
People from Iuka, Mississippi
People from Jasper, Alabama
Democratic Party members of the Alabama House of Representatives